Katerina Koutoungou (born 21 July 1976) is a Greek softball player. She competed in the women's tournament at the 2004 Summer Olympics.

References

1976 births
Living people
Greek softball players
Olympic softball players of Greece
Softball players at the 2004 Summer Olympics
Sportspeople from London, Ontario